The 2017–18 Championnat National 2 was the 20th season of the fourth tier in the French football league system in its current format. The competition was contested by 64 clubs split geographically across 4 groups of 16 teams each. The teams included amateur clubs (although a few were semi-professional) and the reserve teams of professional clubs.

Teams
On July 13, the FFF ratified the constitution of the competition, and published the groups as follows:

 48 clubs who were neither relegated or promoted from the 2016–17 Championnat de France Amateur groups.
 4 teams relegated from 2016–17 Championnat National (Épinal, Belfort, Sedan and CA Bastia). 
 11 teams promoted from 2016–17 Championnat de France Amateur 2. (Saint-Brieuc, Saint-Pryvé, Beauvais, Ste-Geneviève, Saint-Priest, Grasse, Stade Bordelais, Schiltigheim, Le Mans, Furiani-Agliani and Limoges).
 1 team reprieved from relegation from 2016–17 Championnat de France Amateur (Paulhan-Pézenas).

League tables

Season Outcomes

Champions and promotions
The champion of Championnat National 2 is decided by measuring performance of each group winner in matches against the top 6 clubs in their group.

Drancy are champions of 2017–18 Championnat National 2 and are promoted to 2018–19 Championnat National.

Le Mans, Villefranche and Marignane-Gignac are promoted to 2018–19 Championnat National.

Relegation
Paulhan-Pézenas, Raon-l'Étape, Beauvais, Fontenay, Rennes (res), Tarbes, Viry-Châtillon, Montceau, St-Louis Neuweg and AC Amiens were relegated to 2018–19 Championnat National 3 once the reprieves in the next section were taken into account.

After being placed in administration in April, Limoges were given an administrative relegation by the FFF, confirmed on 8 May 2018.

Paulhan-Pézenas and Viry-Châtillon were given additional administrative relegations by the FFF, subject to appeal, on 11 June 2018, meaning neither will contest Championnat National 3 next season.

Reprieves
Any reprieves required due to administrative relegations, mergers or clubs folding are decided by taking, in order, the 14th placed clubs ranked by order of their record against clubs finishing 9th to 13th position in their group, followed by the 15th placed clubs ranked by order of their record against clubs finishing in 10th to 14th position in their group.

On 17 October 2017 the FFF announced that due to SC Bastia not participating in the division as planned, the best 14th placed team will automatically be reprieved from relegation. Marseille (res) were reprieved from relegation.

Trélissac were reprieved from relegation due to the administrative relegation of Limoges.

Best 14th placed team

Best 15th placed team

Top scorers

References 

2017-18
4
Fra